"Girl All the Bad Guys Want" is a single by American rock band Bowling for Soup, from their 2002 album, Drunk Enough to Dance. The song was written by Butch Walker (formerly of Marvelous 3), who has also written songs for Avril Lavigne and SR-71. Released on July 15, 2002, the song reached number eight on the UK Singles Chart, number 15 in Ireland, and number 64 on the US Billboard Hot 100. It was nominated for a 2003 Grammy Award for "Best Pop Performance by a Group or Duo".

"Girl All the Bad Guys Want" came after a dry spell for the band and was followed by the popular album A Hangover You Don't Deserve, leading frontman Jaret Reddick to refer to it as "the career-saving song" on MTV.

Music video
The music video was directed by Smith N Borin and featured the band in various spoofs of nu metal bands' videos, such as Staind's "It's Been Awhile" and Limp Bizkit's "Break Stuff", both of which were directed by Limp Bizkit frontman Fred Durst. In one scene, Jaret as Staind frontman Aaron Lewis is seen singing with a constipated look on his face and is revealed to be on an actual toilet. Another band member urinates on a wall. In the final "Break Stuff" scene three guys dressed as Corey Taylor, Joey Jordison and Shawn Crahan from Slipknot gang up on Jaret dressed as Fred, a reference to the feud between Slipknot and Limp Bizkit at the time. Guitarist Chris Burney also dresses in a parody of Wes Borland's unconventional stage attire and makeup.

The video is inter cut between these scenes and scenes of a girl, played by Linda Christopher and possibly the girl Jaret sings about, watching the band on TVs displayed in a store through the front window.

The music video became the last music video to be played on the British music channel Scuzz directly before its closure on November 15, 2018.

Charts

Weekly charts

Year-end charts

Certifications

Release history

References

2002 songs
2002 singles
Bowling for Soup songs
Jive Records singles
Song recordings produced by Butch Walker
Songs written by Butch Walker
Songs written by Jaret Reddick
UK Independent Singles Chart number-one singles